Ibrahimpur is a village in Azamgarh district in the Indian state of Uttar Pradesh.

Demographics
According to 2001 census population of ibrahimpur is 6,653.

References

Villages in Azamgarh district